Raesfeld is a municipality in the district of Borken in the state of North Rhine-Westphalia, Germany. It is located approximately 10 km south of Borken and 30 km east of the Dutch border.

Raesfeld's landmark is the moated castle , originally built in the 13th century and extended and remodeled in Renaissance style in the 17th century. It is now primarily used by the state of North Rhine-Westphalia as a center for the teaching of crafts; the formal gardens have been lost, but the wildlife park has been restored and is part of the European Garden Heritage Network.

Gallery

References

External links
 Site of the municipality 
 History of the castle 
 Gallery about Raesfeld in general, and the castle 
 Gallery showing the castle

Borken (district)